Kidston may refer to:

Kidston (surname)
Kidston, Queensland, a town in Queensland, Australia
Kidston Island, an island in Baddeck, Nova Scotia, Canada

See also
Kidston Dam, a dam in Queensland, Australia